Pociello is a locality located in the municipality of Capella, Aragon, in Huesca province, Aragon, Spain. As of 2020, it has a population of 12.

Geography 
Pociello is located 96km east of Huesca.

References

Populated places in the Province of Huesca